The Friendship Highway (also known as the China-Nepal Highway) is an  scenic route connecting the capital of Tibet, Lhasa, with the Chinese/Nepalese border at the Sino-Nepal Friendship Bridge between Zhangmu and Kodari.

The 2015 earthquakes in the region closed the highway and caused many evacuations. By 2016 there were some repairs but trading on the route was not restored to pre-quake levels.

Background
From Lhasa, the Friendship Highway follows the Kyi Chu river for about  up to the confluence with the Yarlung Tsangpo River (Brahmaputra) at Chushul. The main route continues along the Yarlung valley up to Shigatse, Tibet's second-largest city and formerly the home of the Panchen Lamas.

From Shigatse, continuing west parallel to the Yarlung Tsangpo valley, the road passes Lhatse and forks just beyond at Chapu, where China National Highway 219 continues west and upriver, finally crossing the Brahmaputra/Indus divide near sacred Mount Kailash and Lake Manasarovar, then on to Ali in Gar County.

From Chapu near Lhatse, the Friendship Highway maintains the Hwy 318 route number and turns southwest and crosses the main Brahmaputra-Ganges divide at Gyatso La, the highest pass on the road.  Descending 1,000 meters onto alluvial plains of the Bum-Chu, also known as the Arun river in Nepal, the highway passes near Shelkar (New Tingri) then through Old Tingri, both gateways to Rongbuk Monastery and the north side of Mount Everest.

Continuing southwest, the highway climbs over Lalung La and crosses shortly after the Tong La (also known as Thong La, Yakri Shung La or Yakrushong La), which marks the water divide between the Bum-Chu / Arun and the (Matsang Tsangpo / Sun Kosi) rivers. The Friendship Highway then descends along the Matsang Tsangpo through Nyalam, then more steeply through a canyon to Zhangmu. The road ends at the Friendship Bridge on the China-Nepal border at a mere  elevation. The continuation of the road between the border town of Kodari to Kathmandu is named Arniko Rajmarg.

Scenery along the highway features important cultural monuments, the upper valley of the Yarlung Tsangpo (Brahmaputra) River, vast grasslands and meadows, and mountain vistas including five of the world's highest peaks: Everest, Lhotse, Makalu, Cho Oyu and Shishapangma as well as partially unexplored and unclimbed peaks east of Tong La reaching  at Labuche Kang.

Gallery

See also
 China National Highway 318
 Everest road
 Araniko Highway

References

 
 
 Tibet map, Gizimap, Budapest, Hungary

Roads in Tibet
China–Nepal border